Darlingtonia State Natural Site (18 acres) is a state park and botanical preserve located  north of Florence, Oregon, United States on U.S. Route 101, just west of Mercer Lake and south of Sutton Lake that is dedicated to the preservation of a rare plant.

Darlingtonia californica is a carnivorous plant, commonly known as the cobra lily, which traps insects in its hollow tubular leaves, whose top is flared into a hollow dome with a forked "tongue" that gives the species its common name. In late spring, they bear purple and yellow flowers that rise above the green cobra-like leaves. Darlingtonia are found only in wet meadows and bogs with acidic soils low in nitrogen. The rare, strangely shaped plant is the only member of the pitcher plant family Sarraceniaceae in Oregon.

The park has a short loop trail through a peat bog area overlooking patches of Darlingtonia. It is the only Oregon state park dedicated to the protection of a single plant species.

See also 
 List of botanical gardens in the United States
 List of Oregon State Parks

External links

External links

 

Oregon Coast
Parks in Lane County, Oregon
Sarraceniaceae
State parks of Oregon